Events in Italy in 1237:

Events 
 Battle of Cortenuova
 Gualdo Tadino is destroyed by fire

Deaths 
 Villanus

References 

Italy
Italy
Years of the 13th century in Italy